Blaine Kruger (born August 23, 1985) is a former Canadian football wide receiver who played one season with the Calgary Stampeders of the Canadian Football League. He was signed by the Stampeders as an undrafted free agent in 2009. He played CIS football for the UBC Thunderbirds. He played junior football with the Victoria Rebels.

External links
Calgary Stampeders bio

1985 births
Living people
Calgary Stampeders players
Canadian football wide receivers
People from Cochrane, Alberta
Players of Canadian football from Alberta
UBC Thunderbirds football players